Protarchus may refer to:
 , Ancient Greek sophist
 Protarchus (wasp), a genus of wasps in the family Ichneumonidae